Russell S. Doughten Jr. (February 16, 1927 – August 19, 2013) was an American filmmaker and producer of numerous short and feature-length Christian films. His film work is credited under numerous variations of his name: with or without the "Jr." suffix or middle initial, and sometimes using the informal "Russ" instead of "Russell". Nearly all of his Christian films were shot in various locales in his home state of Iowa.

Early career 

Doughten studied drama at Drake University. He then taught high school for a number of years, after which he studied drama at Yale University.  While on the East Coast, he began working for Good News Productions in Pennsylvania as a producer, director, editor, and writer. With Good News, he produced feature films, a children's gospel hour, and a Salvation Army recruiting film.

Good News Productions partnered with Jack H. Harris and Valley Forge Films to make the 1958 sci-fi classic, The Blob. Doughten worked as Associate Producer on the film.

In the mid-1960s, Doughten taught English and drama and supervised and directed student productions at South Pasadena High School in California. His former students report that he was exacting in demanding their best efforts, but they were proud of the results and the quality of the productions he directed and they regretted his departure in 1964 to return to film-making in Iowa.

Becoming disillusioned with Hollywood, Doughten returned to Des Moines, where he started his first production company, Heartland Productions in 1965.  His early feature-length films were The Hostage (1966) and Fever Heat (1968). He would eventually produce a total of eight feature films through Heartland.

A Thief in the Night
In 1972, Doughten launched Mark IV Productions in partnership with co-founder Donald W. Thompson. They would produce 12 feature-length Christian films over a 12-year period, including the films that Doughten is best known for, the Thief In The Night series.  The series dramatizes the Rapture and Tribulation and the struggles of a small band of believers against an increasingly hostile worldwide Antichrist dictatorship.

The films in the series are:
 A Thief in the Night (1972)
 A Distant Thunder (1978)
 Image of the Beast (1980)
 The Prodigal Planet (1983)

Doughten appears in all four films as Reverend Matthew Turner, a survivalist who has an elaborate chart of the End Times events, but did not fully believe in the Bible until after the Rapture, even if not accepting Christ as his savior. With his long, graying hair usually worn in a ponytail and shaggy beard, he didn't look the part of the stereotypical Christian fundamentalist, a fact that is credited with earning him secular fans,as is his use of unusual camera angles and layered audio.

While there had been feature-length Christian films before, including the End Times film If Footmen Tire You, What Will Horses Do? directed by Ron Ormond in 1971, a sweeping, ambitious project like Thief—with three sequels telling one continuous story over the course of a decade—had never been undertaken even in Hollywood. Doughten's identification of the Antichrist not with Communism as Ormond had done, nor with Jack Chick's sinister view of the Vatican, but rather with a worldwide government that initially acts as a global peacemaker, i.e. the United Nations, is consistent with many other Biblical  interpretations of the Tribulation.

While the films were clearly made on a low budget, and the dated 1970s fashions shown in the early films provide unintentional amusement today, there is no denying the series' influence among Christian fundamentalists. A Thief in the Night is said to be the most widely seen Gospel film in the world and has been influential in many conversions to Christianity.  Tim LaHaye and Jerry B. Jenkins cite Doughten's films as being the primary influence for their million selling Left Behind series of books and films. Doughten's films have been frequently shown in churches and on Christian television stations.

Later Years 

Doughten continued to produce films through Heartland Productions even during the time the Thief franchise was continuing.  Some of his later credits through Heartland were Sammy (1977), Nite Song (1978), Whitcomb's War (1980), and Face in the Mirror (1988).

The volume of work Doughten produced through Heartland Productions, Mark IV Productions, and Russell Doughten Productions ranks him as the leading filmmaker in the history of Iowa.

In 2001, Doughten was awarded the Lifetime Achievement Award at the WYSIWYG Film Festival, and the National Religious Broadcasters Association presented him the Milestone Award for 50 years of achievement in presenting the gospel through film.

Casting agent Kimberly Busbee referred to Doughen as "the godfather of independent film in Iowa." He was a regular attendee at Iowa's Wild Rose Independent Film Festival, and had mentored many indie filmmakers in Iowa.

Doughten died from a cardiac-related illness on August 19, 2013.

Filmography

References

External links
Russ Doughten Films Website

Review of "A Thief In The Night"
Russell S. Doughten Jr. Obituary

1927 births
2013 deaths
Film directors from Iowa
American evangelicals
People from Carlisle, Iowa
20th-century American male actors
Film producers from Iowa
Male actors from Iowa
American male film actors